On 3 January 2021, a group of Islamic State (IS) militants killed 11 Hazara coal miners after being kidnapped in Machh, Balochistan, Pakistan.

The attack 
The miners were on their way to work when the gunmen ambushed and dragged them into the nearby mountains.

All 11 miners were blindfolded and had their hands tied behind their backs before having their throats slit. Video of the miners' murders shows the dead men strewn out on the floor of a village hut. The victims were members of the minority Shia community.

Protests 

Not long after the attack, Hazaras blocked roads and burned tires in Quetta, the capital of Balochistan province. They gathered to protest the terror attacks on them and to demonstrate their minority rights. They demanded that the Prime Minister visit them and personally assure them that justice would be served in the case of the lynched miners.

A demonstration organized by the Majlis Wahdat-e-Muslimeen in Karachi continued for three days at over twenty locations in the city. Balochistan's Shia Hazara community continued a sit-in protest with the dead bodies for six straight days on Quetta’s Western Bypass, refusing to bury the murdered miners.

Government action and burial 
The government ordered the law enforcement agency to investigate the incident and bring the perpetrators to justice, with Prime Minister Imran Khan denouncing the murders as "an inhumane act of terrorism".

The Interior Minister Sheikh Rasheed Ahmad also visited the families of the victims and assured them that the culprits involved in the attack will be brought to justice at all costs. He expressed condolences to the families of victims and announced compensation for them. The attack was also condemned by Afghanistan. The Ministry of Foreign Affairs of Afghanistan stated that seven Afghan Hazaras were among the 11 miners who were killed.

On January 9, 2021, the miners were buried at Hazara Town cemetery in Quetta. The same day, Imran Khan reached Quetta where he met the families of the murdered miners.

Claim of responsibility 
In due course, the Islamic State (IS) claimed responsibility for the attack through the Telegram communication channel of the Amaq news agency.

See also
 List of terrorist incidents in 2021
 List of terrorist incidents linked to ISIL

References

2021 in Balochistan, Pakistan
2021 murders in Pakistan
2020s crimes in Balochistan, Pakistan
21st-century mass murder in Pakistan
Afghanistan–Pakistan relations
Islamic terrorist incidents in 2021
Insurgency in Balochistan
ISIL terrorist incidents in Pakistan
January 2021 crimes in Asia
Kachhi District
Kidnappings in Pakistan
Mass kidnappings of the 2020s
Mass murder in Balochistan, Pakistan
Massacres in 2021
Massacres of Hazara people
Terrorist incidents in Balochistan, Pakistan
Terrorist incidents in Pakistan in 2021
January 2021 events in Pakistan